= List of schools in Isfahan =

List of public & private, girls & boys, elementary & high schools inside Isfahan, Iran.

== Non-public girls high schools ==
=== District 1 ===
- Motahhari High School
- Pardis High School
- Roshangar High School
- Taybat High School

=== District 2 ===
- Hadaf High School
- Noor Al-Absar High School
- Shaygan High School
- Marzieh High School
- Molood Kaaba High School
- Imam Amir Al-Momenin High School
- Mehro Danesh High School
- Anwar Al-Quran High School
- Asre danesh High School

=== District 3 ===
- Raisi High School
- Gozine javan High school
- Isfahan University High School (formerly Edalat)
- Pooyandegan High School
- Golestan High School
- Shahrbanoo High School
- Azarmidakht High School
- Faraz High School
- Shayan High School
- High School of Tamadon
- Imam Sadegh High School
- Sedaghat High School
- Nick Ahang High School
- White Pen High School
- Shahrzad High School
- Kowsar Danesh High School
- Atrat Sepahan High School

=== District 4 ===
- High school mazhare danesh
- High school va al-asr
- Tahora High School
- High school honaramoozan
- Shokooh Zeinab High School

=== District 5 ===
- Danaskhan High School
- High School Gozine javan Mehr
- jame high school for girls
- Imam Mohammad Baqir High School
- Sayed Al-Shuhada High School
- Azadi High School
- Fatemeh High School
- Al Zahra High School
- Shamim Danesh High School
- Dr. Azidhak High School
- Pishgaman Saba High School
- Gulab High School
